Peter Carleton was an Anglican priest in Ireland in the eighteenth century.

Carleton was born in Dublin and educated at Trinity College, Dublin. He was Dean of Killaloe from 1790 until 1808; and Prebendary of Aghadowey  in Derry Cathedral from 1808 until his resignation in 1813.

Notes

Alumni of Trinity College Dublin
Deans of Killaloe
18th-century Irish Anglican priests
19th-century Irish Anglican priests
Christian clergy from Dublin (city)